The initials SLJ or slj may refer to:

 School Library Journal, with articles and book reviews for library professionals
 Stellar Airpark, near Chandler, Arizona, IATA code
 Southern Literary Journal, of the US South
 Samuel L. Jackson, American actor
 Solomon Airport, IATA airport code "SLJ"